Switzerland defeated Australia in the final 2–0 to win its first Billie Jean King Cup tennis event.

The Billie Jean King Cup Finals is the highest level of the Billie Jean King Cup competition in 2022. The competition took place in Glasgow from 8 to 13 November 2022. The ties were contested in a best-of-three rubbers format and played on one day. There were two singles followed by a doubles. The finals featured 12 teams.

The Russian Tennis Federation were the reigning champions, but they were banned from competing in international tennis events following the 2022 Russian invasion of Ukraine.

Participating teams
12 nations take part in the Finals. The qualification was as follows:
 1 finalist of the previous edition (Switzerland, defending champion Russia was suspended)
 1 highest-ranked losing semi-finalist of the previous edition (Australia)
 1 host nation (Great Britain)
 7 winners of the qualifying round in April 2022 
 1 team received a bye in the qualifying round (Slovakia) and 1 team qualified with a walkover (Belgium)

Team nominations
SR = Singles ranking, DR = Doubles ranking. Rankings are as of 7 November 2022.

Format
The 12 teams are divided in four round robin groups of three teams each. The four group winners will qualify for the semifinals.

Group stage

Overview
T = Ties, M = Matches, S = Sets

Group A

Switzerland vs. Italy

Canada vs. Italy

Switzerland vs. Canada

Group B

Australia vs. Slovakia

Slovakia  vs. Belgium

Australia vs. Belgium

Note: Tomljanovic's retirement victory over Mertens was counted as a 4–6, 6–4, 6–0 win.

Group C

Kazakhstan  vs. Great Britain

Spain  vs. Kazakhstan

Spain vs. Great Britain

Group D

United States vs. Poland

Czech Republic vs. Poland

Czech Republic vs. United States

Knockout stage

Bracket

Semifinals

Switzerland vs. Czech Republic

Great Britain vs. Australia

Final

Switzerland vs. Australia

References

External links
Official website

Finals
Billie Jean King Cup Finals
Billie Jean King
International sports competitions in Glasgow